Moa is an Indonesian island, at the center of the Leti Islands, and one of the 92 officially listed outlying islands of Indonesia. Moa is located in southwest Maluku province. The main town is Tiakur.

The Leti language, a member of Austronesian languages is spoken on Moa.

See also

 Islands of Indonesia
 Maluku Islands
 Maluku (province)

Transports 
The island is served by the Jos Orno Imsula Airport .

References

 

Islands of the Maluku Islands
Outer Banda Arc
Landforms of Maluku (province)
Populated places in Indonesia